Prayut cabinet may refer to:

* First Prayut cabinet, the Thai government led by Prayut Chan-o-cha from 30 August 2014 to 16 July 2019
 Second Prayut cabinet, the Thai government led by Prayut Chan-o-cha since 16 July 2019